Stone County is located in the southwestern portion of the U.S. state of Missouri. As of the 2020 census, the population was 31,076. Its county seat is Galena.

Stone County is part of the Branson, MO Micropolitan Statistical Area.

History
The county was officially organized on February 10, 1851, and is named after William Stone, an English pioneer and an early settler in Maryland who also served as Taney County Judge.

In 1904, the White River Railway was extended through the rugged terrain of Stone and Taney counties. By then, both counties had had a sundown town policy for years, forbidding African Americans from living there.

Geography

Adjacent counties
Christian County (north)
Taney County (east)
Carroll County, Arkansas (south)
Barry County (west)
Lawrence County (northwest)

National protected area
Mark Twain National Forest (part)

Demographics

As of the census of 2000, there were 28,658 people, 11,822 households, and 8,842 families residing in the county. The population density was 62 people per square mile (24/km2). There were 16,241 housing units at an average density of 35 per square mile (14/km2). The racial makeup of the county was 97.64% White, 0.07% Black or African American, 0.61% Native American, 0.18% Asian, 0.03% Pacific Islander, 0.25% from other races, and 1.20% from two or more races. Approximately 1.04% of the population were Hispanic or Latino of any race. Among the major first ancestries reported in Stone County were 24.3% American, 20.4% German, 11.3% English, and 10.8% Irish ancestry.

There were 11,822 households, out of which 25.60% had children under the age of 18 living with them, 64.70% were married couples living together, 7.20% had a female householder with no husband present, and 25.20% were non-families. 21.40% of all households were made up of individuals, and 10.30% had someone living alone who was 65 years of age or older. The average household size was 2.40 and the average family size was 2.76.

In the county, the population was spread out, with 21.40% under the age of 18, 6.20% from 18 to 24, 23.80% from 25 to 44, 29.70% from 45 to 64, and 18.90% who were 65 years of age or older. The median age was 44 years. For every 100 females, there were 96.20 males. For every 100 females age 18 and over, there were 93.10 males.

The median income for a household in the county was $40,487, and the median income for a family was $46,675. Males had a median income of $26,224 versus $19,190 for females. The per capita income for the county was $21,813. About 8.50% of families and 12.80% of the population were below the poverty line, including 19.00% of those under age 18 and 8.10% of those age 65 or over.

2020 Census

Education
Of adults 25 years of age and older in Stone County, 80.4% possesses a high school diploma or higher while 14.2% holds a bachelor's degree or higher as their highest educational attainment.

Public schools
Blue Eye R-V School District - Blue Eye
Blue Eye Elementary School (PK-04)
Blue Eye Middle School (05-08)
Blue Eye High School (09-12)
Crane R-III School District - Crane
Crane Elementary School (K-06)
Crane High School (07-12)
Galena R-II School District - Galena
Galena-Abesville Elementary School (PK-06)
Galena High School (07-12)
Hurley R-I School District - Hurley
Hurley Elementary School (K-05)
Hurley High School (06-12)
Reeds Spring R-IV School District - Reeds Spring
Reeds Spring Primary School (PK-01)
Reeds Spring Elementary School (02-04)
Reeds Spring Intermediate School (05-06)
Reeds Spring Middle School (07-08)
Reeds Spring High School (09-12)

Private schools
Apostolic Christian School - Reeds Spring - (05-12) - Non-denominational Christian

Alternative and vocational schools
Tri-Lakes Special Education Cooperative - Blue Eye - (K-12) - Special Education
Gibson Technical Center - Reeds Spring - (09-12) - Vocational/Technical
New Horizons Alternative School - Reeds Spring - (06-12) - Alternative/Other

Public libraries
Blue Eye Public Library
Crane Public Library
Galena Public Library
Kimberling Area Library

Politics and government

Government
Stone County is a third-class county located in Southwest Missouri. The county's government includes a 3-person County Commission (Presiding Commissioner, Northern District Commissioner, Southern District Commissioner), several elected officials, and a Road Commission consisting of the 3 County Commissioners as well as a Northern Road Commissioner and a Southern Road Commissioner. The County Commission also oversees the Planning and Zoning Department, Senior Citizens' Services Board, a Law Enforcement Restitution Board, and neighborhood improvement districts. All elected Officials in Stone County serve 4 year terms. The county
employed 157 full-time employees (including elected officials) and 12 part-time employees as of December 31, 2019.

The Government primarily operates out of the County Seat of Galena, Missouri. The offices of the County Commission, County Clerk, Collector of Revenue, Recorder of Deeds, Treasurer as well as the University of Missouri Extension Office all operate out of the Historic Courthouse in the center of the square. The Stone County Sheriff's office, Judiciary, Circuit Clerk, and Jail are all in the Stone County Judicial Center on the east side of the square. The Assessor and Planning and Zoning offices are located in buildings on the south side of the square.

The Republican Party completely controls politics at the local level in Stone County. All current office holders are members of the Republican Party. Elected Officials in Stone County on average have a long tenure once elected to office.

State

Stone County is divided into two legislative districts in the Missouri House of Representatives, both of which are held by Republicans.

District 138 — Brad Hudson (R-Cape Fair). Consists of almost all of the county.

District 158 — Scott Cupps (R-Shell Knob). Consists of a small, unincorporated region in the northwest part of the county, located just south of Crane.  

All of Stone County is a part of Missouri's 29th District in the Missouri Senate and is currently represented by Mike Moon (R-Ash Grove)

Federal

All of Stone County is included in Missouri's 7th Congressional District and is currently represented by Billy Long (R-Springfield) in the U.S. House of Representatives.

Political culture

Like most counties situated in Southwest Missouri, Stone County is a Republican stronghold in presidential elections. George W. Bush carried Stone County in 2000 and 2004 by more than two-to-one margins, and like many other rural counties throughout Missouri, Stone County strongly favored John McCain over Barack Obama in 2008. The solitary Democratic presidential candidate to win Stone County since the Civil War has been Franklin Delano Roosevelt in 1932, and even Roosevelt won by only 163 votes out of 3,688.

Like most rural areas throughout the Bible Belt in Southwest Missouri, voters in Stone County traditionally adhere to socially and culturally conservative principles which tend to strongly influence their Republican leanings. In 2004, Missourians voted on a constitutional amendment to define marriage as the union between a man and a woman—it overwhelmingly passed Stone County with 79.87 percent of the vote. The initiative passed the state with 71 percent of support from voters as Missouri became the first state to ban same-sex marriage. In 2006, Missourians voted on a constitutional amendment to fund and legalize embryonic stem cell research in the state—it narrowly failed in Stone County with 52.80 percent voting against the measure. The initiative narrowly passed the state with 51 percent of support from voters as Missouri became one of the first states in the nation to approve embryonic stem cell research. Despite Stone County's longstanding tradition of supporting socially conservative platforms, voters in the county have a penchant for advancing populist causes like increasing the minimum wage. In 2006, Missourians voted on a proposition (Proposition B) to increase the minimum wage in the state to $6.50 an hour—it passed Stone County with 76.72 percent of the vote. The proposition strongly passed every single county in Missouri with 78.99 percent voting in favor as the minimum wage was increased to $6.50 an hour in the state. During the same election, voters in five other states also strongly approved increases in the minimum wage.

2008 Missouri presidential primary
Democratic
Former U.S. Senator and Secretary of State Hillary Rodham Clinton (D-New York) won Stone County over President Barack Obama (D-Illinois) by an almost two-to-one margin with 61.76 percent of the vote while Obama received 35.17 percent of the vote. Although he withdrew from the race, former U.S. Senator John Edwards (D-North Carolina) still received 2.16 percent of the vote in Stone County.

Republican
Former Governor Mike Huckabee (R-Arkansas) won Stone County with 45.01 percent of the vote. U.S. Senator John McCain (R-Arizona) finished in second place in Stone County with 31.82 percent. Former Governor Mitt Romney (R-Massachusetts) came in third place, receiving 18.80 percent of the vote while libertarian-leaning U.S. Representative Ron Paul (R-Texas) finished fourth with 2.74 percent in Stone County.

Mike Huckabee received more votes, a total of 2,528, than any candidate from either party in Stone County during the 2008 Missouri presidential primaries.

Transportation

Major highways

 Route 13
 Route 76
 Route 86
 Route 173
 Route 176
 Route 248
 Route 265
 Route 413

Airports
Branson West Airport, also known as Branson West Municipal Airport, is a public-use general aviation airport in Stone County. It is located two nautical miles (3.7 km) west of the central business district of the Branson West, which owns the airport.

Communities

Cities

Branson West
Crane
Galena (county seat)
Hurley
Kimberling City (largest city)
Reeds Spring

Villages

Blue Eye
Coney Island
Indian Point
McCord Bend

Census-designated place
Shell Knob (partly in Barry County)

Unincorporated communities

Abesville
Browns Spring
Cape Fair
Carico
Carr Lane
Cross Roads
Elsey
Jamesville
Lampe
Notch
Oto
Ponce de Leon
Possum Trot
Reeds Spring Junction
Union City
Viola
White City

See also
National Register of Historic Places listings in Stone County, Missouri

References

External links
Official website
Stone County Library
Digitized 1930 Plat Book of Stone County  from University of Missouri Division of Special Collections, Archives, and Rare Books
Stone County, Missouri Census Report

 
Branson, Missouri micropolitan area
1851 establishments in Missouri
Populated places established in 1851
Sundown towns in Missouri